This is a list of members of the Western Australian Legislative Assembly from 1974 to 1977. All members denoted "National Country" were elected under the National Alliance banner, but shortly thereafter adopted the name "National Country Party".

Notes
 On 21 August 1975, the Liberal member for Greenough, former Premier Sir David Brand, resigned. Liberal candidate Reg Tubby won the resulting by-election on 1 November 1975.

Members of Western Australian parliaments by term